Northern Evangelical Lutheran Church, Suri (NELC) is a heritage church in Birbhum district in the Indian state of West Bengal. This is a Northern Evangelical Lutheran Church situated at Lalkuthipara, Suri.

History
It is commonly known as Laal Girja. The Church was established in 1876 by the Baptist missionaries of Suri. The building was made following European architectural style. In 2016 the Church Committee renovated the building.

References 

1876 establishments in India
Churches in West Bengal
Tourist attractions in Birbhum district

External links